Mariko Nash (1969 – August 2016), better known by his stage name Reek Daddy, and also Instigator or Freak da Babbi was an American rapper from Vallejo, California. He was the owner of NOYB Records, a subdivision late Mac Dre's label Thizz Entertainment.

Discography

Studio albums
 Gangsta Of The Year (2000, unreleased)
 Wreak Havoc (2003)
 25 to Life on the Streets (2003)
 Babbi Land (2006)
 The Reekalation (2006)
 Cutthoat Bizz (2007)
 Sawyer St. Mob (2007) (with Boss Hogg)
 Sacto 2 Da Crest (2009) (with Mr. Skrillz)
 Super Thug (2009)
 Straight Pirate Type (2010)
 Cuddy Bang (2010)
 The Reekalation II (2011)
 Gangsta Of The Year Volume II (2012)
 Dipped in Butter (2013)
 DLK Collabs Vol. 2 (2014)
 Serious as Cancer (2014)
 Pocket Full of Felonies (2015)
 Firey Hot Rocks (2016)

Guest appearances

References

External links
Official Reek Daddy Twitter
Official Reek Daddy on Myspace

1969 births
2016 deaths
African-American male rappers
Musicians from Vallejo, California
Rappers from the San Francisco Bay Area
20th-century African-American people
21st-century African-American people